The skull is the bony structure in the head of a craniate.

Skull or Skulls may also refer to:

Places
 Skull Lake, British Columbia, Canada
 Skull Creek (disambiguation)
 2015 TB145, a celestial object that passed Earth in 2015, known as the "Skull Asteroid"
 Schull, County Cork, Ireland

People
 Skull (singer), Korean reggae singer
 Nevio Skull (1903–1945), Italian businessman and politician
 "Skull", nickname of Kerry O'Keeffe (born 1949), Australian former cricketer
 Harris Brothers, an American professional wrestling duo, also known as Skull and 8-Ball

Arts and entertainment

Fictional characters and organizations
 Eugene "Skull" Skullovitch, one of duo Bulk and Skull, in the Power Rangers universe
 Skull, a character in the 1983 film Scarface
 Skull the Slayer, a Marvel Comics character
 Skull, the codename for Ryuji Sakamoto, a character from Persona 5

Films
 The Skull, a 1965 British horror film directed by Freddie Francis
 The Skulls (film), a 2000 American psychological thriller
 Skull: The Mask, a 2020 Brazilian-American horror film

Music
 Skull (music), a percussion instrument
 The Skull (band), a heavy metal band
 The Skulls (American band), a punk rock band from Los Angeles
 The Skulls (Canadian band), a punk rock band from Vancouver
 The Skull (album), a 1985 album by Trouble
 "Skull" (song), a song by Sebadoh from the 1994 album Bakesale
 "Skulls" (Misfits song), a song by the Misfits from the 1982 album Walk Among Us
 "Skulls", a song by Bastille from the 2013 album All This Bad Blood
 "Skulls", a song by Halestorm from the 2018 album Vicious

Short stories
 "The Skull" (short story), a short story by Philip K. Dick

Other uses
 Skulls, members of the international college fraternity Phi Kappa Sigma
 Skulls Unlimited International, a commercial supplier of osteological specimens located in Oklahoma City, Oklahoma

See also
 Calaveras (disambiguation), Spanish equivalent of the word
 Cranium (disambiguation)
 Crystal skull (disambiguation)
 Schull, County Cork, Ireland
 Scull (disambiguation), a homophone
 Skull Valley (Utah)
 Skull and crossbones (disambiguation)